The surname Guillemin can refer to:

Philippe François Zéphirin Guillemin (1814-1886), Roman Catholic bishop
Amédée Guillemin (1826–1893), French science author and journalist
Amédée Henri Guillemin (1860-1941), French WWI general
Anne-Marie Guillemin (1868–1963), French translator of Latin texts
Ernst Guillemin (1898–1970), American electrical engineer and computer scientist
Francisco Romano Guillemin (1884–1950), Mexican painter
Jean Baptiste Antoine Guillemin (1796–1842), French botanist
Jean-Philippe Guillemin (born 1972), French Open-source computer programmer and musician
Jeanne Guillemin (1943–2019), American medical anthropologist
Roger Guillemin (born 1924), neurologist and Nobel laureate in medicine
Victor Guillemin (born 1937), American mathematician
Robert Charles Guillemin (born 1939), ephemeral artist known as Sidewalk Sam